Afrogarypus is a genus of pseudoscorpions, which contains the following species:

 Afrogarypus basilewskyi
 Afrogarypus curtus
 Afrogarypus excelsus
 Afrogarypus excelsus excellens
 Afrogarypus excelsus excelsus
 Afrogarypus impressus
 Afrogarypus intermedius intermedius
 Afrogarypus intermedius nanus
 Afrogarypus monticola
 Afrogarypus plumatus
 Afrogarypus pseudocurtus
 Afrogarypus rhodesiacus
 Afrogarypus senegalensis
 Afrogarypus seychellesensis
 Afrogarypus stellifer
 Afrogarypus subimpressus
 Afrogarypus sulcatus
 Afrogarypus zonatus

References 

Pseudoscorpion genera
Geogarypidae